The Mbuti people, or Bambuti, are one of several indigenous pygmy groups in the Congo region of Africa. Their languages are Central Sudanic languages and Bantu languages.

Subgroups
Bambuti are pygmy hunter-gatherers, and are one of the oldest indigenous people of the Congo region of Africa. The Bambuti are composed of bands which are relatively small in size, ranging from 15 to 60 people. The Bambuti population totals about 30,000 to 40,000 people. Many Batwa in various parts of the DRC call themselves Bambuti as well.

There are three distinct subgroups:

 The Sua (also Kango, or Mbuti), who speak a dialect (or perhaps two) of the language of a neighboring Bantu people, Bila. They are located centrally and are eponymous of the larger group.
 The Efé, who speak the language of the neighboring Central Sudanic Lese.
 The Asua, speakers of the Mangbetu  (Central Sudanic) Asua language.

Environment 

In this area, there is a high amount of rainfall annually, ranging from .The dry season is in January, and then May through August. The forest is a moist, humid region strewn with rivers and lakes. Several ecological problems exist which affect the Bambuti. Disease is prevalent in the forests and can spread quickly, killing not only humans, but plants, and animals, the major source of food, as well. One disease, carried by tsetse flies, is sleeping sickness, which limits the use of large mammals. Too much rainfall, as well as droughts, can greatly diminish the food supply.

Culture

Settlement, architecture and organization 
The Bambuti live in villages that are categorized as bands. Each hut houses a family unit. At the start of the dry season, they leave the village to enter the forest and set up a series of camps. This way, the Bambuti are able to utilize more land area for maximum foraging. These villages are solitary and separated from other groups of people. Their houses are small, circular, and very temporary.

House construction begins with the tracing of the outline of the house into the ground. The walls of the structures are strong sticks that are placed in the ground, and at the top of the sticks, a vine is tied around them to keep them together. Large leaves and grass are used in the construction of the hut roofs.

Food and resources 

The Bambuti are primarily hunter-gatherers. Their animal diet can include crabs, shellfish, ants, larvae, snails, wild pigs, antelopes, monkeys, fish, and honey. The vegetable component of their diet includes wild yams, berries, fruits, roots, leaves, and kola nuts.

The Bambuti have an elaborate system of food allowances and restrictions; foods that are restricted are called kweri. Food sources yielded by the forest are non-kweri animals for meat consumption, root plants, palm trees, and bananas; and in some seasons, wild honey. Yams, legumes, beans, peanuts, hibiscus, amaranth, and gourds are consumed. The Bambuti use large nets, traps, and bows and arrows to hunt game. Women and children sometimes assist in the hunt by driving the prey into the nets. Both sexes gather and forage. Each band has its own hunting ground, although boundaries are hard to maintain. The Mbuti call the forest "mother" and "father" as the mood seizes them, because, like their parents, the forest gives them food, shelter, and clothing, which are readily made from abundant forest materials.

The Bantu villagers produce many items that the hunter-gatherers trade some of their products for. They often obtain iron goods, pots, wooden goods, and basketry, in exchange for meat, animal hides, and other forest goods. Bushmeat is a particularly frequently traded item. They will also trade to obtain agricultural products from the villagers through barter.

Hunting is usually done in groups, with men, women, and children all aiding in the process. Women and children are not involved if the hunting involves the use of a bow and arrow, but if nets are used, it is common for everyone to participate. In some instances, women may hunt using a net more often than men. The women and the children herd the animals to the net, while the men guard the net. Everyone engages in foraging, and women and men both take care of the children. Women are in charge of cooking, cleaning and repairing the hut, and obtaining water. The kin-based units work together to provide food and care for the young. It is easier for men to lift the women into the trees for honey.

Food restrictions
According to a study published in 1987, based on fieldwork and data gathered between 1974 and 1985, the Mbuti restrict some 40% of the over 500 species of plants and animals they gather and hunt, including some 85% of the animals. The kweri animals are thought to cause disease and disorder, especially to young children; restrictions are gradually relaxed as one ages.

Kinship and descent system 
The Bambuti tend to follow a patrilineal descent system, and their residences after marriage are patrilocal. However, the system is rather loose. The only type of group seen amongst the Bambuti is the nuclear family. Kinship also provides allies for each group of people.

Marriage customs 
Sister exchange is the common form of marriage. Based on reciprocal exchange, men from other bands exchange sisters or other females to whom they have ties. In Bambuti society, bride wealth is not customary. There is no formal marriage ceremony: a couple are considered officially married when the groom presents his bride's parents with an antelope he alone has hunted and killed. Polygamy does occur, but at different rates depending on the group, and it is not very common. The sexual intercourse of married couples is regarded as an act entirely different from that of unmarried partners, for only in marriage may children be conceived.

Political structure 
Bambuti societies have no ruling group or lineage, no overlying political organization, and little social structure. The Bambuti are an egalitarian society in which the band is the highest form of social organization. Leadership may be displayed for example on hunting treks. Men become leaders because they are good hunters. Owing to their superior hunting ability, leaders eat more meat and fat and fewer carbohydrates than other men. Men and women basically have equal power. Issues are discussed and decisions are made by consensus at fire camps; men and women engage in the conversations equivalently. If there is a disagreement, misdemeanor, or offense, then the offender may be banished, beaten, or scorned. In more recent times the practice is to remove the offender from the forest and have them work for private landowners for little to no pay.

Mythology

Everything in the Bambuti life is centered on the forest. They consider the forest to be their great protector and provider and believe that it is a sacred place. They sometimes call the forest "mother" or "father". An important ritual that impacts the Bambuti's life is referred to as molimo. After events such as death of an important person in the tribe, molimo is noisily celebrated to wake the forest, in the belief that if bad things are happening to its children, it must be asleep. As with many Bambuti rituals, the time it takes to complete a molimo is not rigidly set; instead, it is determined by the mood of the group. Food is collected from each hut to feed the molimo, and in the evening the ritual is accompanied by the men dancing and singing around the fire. Women and children must remain in their huts with the doors closed. These practices were studied thoroughly by British anthropologist Colin Turnbull, known primarily for his work with the tribe.

"Molimo" is also the name of a trumpet the men play during the ritual. Traditionally, it was made of wood or sometimes bamboo, but Turnbull also reported the use of metal drainpipes. The sound produced by a molimo is considered more important than the material it is made out of. When not in use, the trumpet is stored in the trees of the forest. During a celebration, the trumpet is retrieved by the youth of the village and carried back to the fire.

Contemporary situation 
The way of life of the Bambuti is threatened for various reasons. Their territory in the DRC has no legal protections, and the boundaries that each band claims are not formally established. Bambuti are no longer allowed to hunt large game. Due to deforestation, gold mining, and modern influences from plantations, agriculturalists, and efforts to conserve the forests, their food supply is threatened. There is also significant civil unrest in the country.

The Bambuti have also been targets of a genocide campaign known as Effacer le tableau.

Genetics

Y-chromosomal haplogroup E-M200 has been found in 25% (3/12) of a small sample of Mbuti from the Democratic Republic of the Congo. Haplogroup B-P7 has been observed most frequently in samples of some populations of pygmies 21% (10/47) Mbuti from Democratic Republic of the Congo.

Languages
There are three distinct languages spoken by the Mbuti:

Kango, a Bantu Zone D language related to Bila
Efe, a Mangbutu language related to Lese
Asua language, a Mangbetu language

Efe and Asua are Central Sudanic languages, while Kango is a Niger–Congo language.

Comparative vocabulary
Bantu and Central Sudanic comparative lexicon of Ituri languages:

Some Bantu and Central Sudanic animal names of Ituri languages:

See also 
 Ota Benga (c. 1893–1916), Mbuti man taken to the United States

References

Citations

Works cited

General references

External links 
 Todd Pitman, Mbuti Net Hunters of the Ituri Forest, story with photos and link to Audio Slideshow. The Associated Press, 2010.
The Mbuti of Zaire, uconn.edu
African Pygmies Hunter-Gatherers of Central Africa, with photos and soundscapes
 Stephanie McCrummen, "Lured Toward Modern Life, Pygmy Families Left in Limbo", The Washington Post, 12 November 2006
'Erasing the Board' Report of the international research mission into crimes under international law committed against the Bambuti Pygmies in the eastern Democratic Republic of Congo; Minority Rights Group International, July 2004

African Pygmies
Ethnic groups in the Democratic Republic of the Congo